Caladenia dimorpha, commonly known as spicy caps, is a plant in the orchid family Orchidaceae and is endemic to New South Wales. It is an uncommon ground orchid with a single sparsely hairy leaf, and up to three white flowers which often have pinkish markings.

Description
The front of the petals and sepals is glabrous. The sides of the labellum have thin, finger-like teeth along most of their length. There are four rows of club-shaped, white to yellow calli along the mid-line of the labellum, becoming clumped and purple near its tip. The column has broad wings and red stripes. Flowering occurs from September to October.

Taxonomy and naming
Caladenia dimorpha was first formally described by Robert D. FitzGerald in 1875 and the description was published in Australian Orchids. The type specimen was collected near Bowenfels. The specific epithet (dimorpha) is derived from the Ancient Greek words di meaning "two" and morphe meaning "form" or "shape".

Distribution and habitat
This uncommon caladenia grows in forest in the western part of the Blue Mountains almost to the Victorian border.

References

dimorpha
Plants described in 1875
Endemic orchids of Australia
Orchids of New South Wales